Kim Peacock (1901–1966) was born on 24 March 1901 in Watford, Hertfordshire, England. He was an actor and writer, known for Midnight at the Wax Museum (1936), BBC Sunday-Night Theatre (1950) and Hit Parade (1952). He died on 26 December 1966 in Emsworth, Hampshire. He played the title character in the BBC Radio serial Paul Temple between 1946 and 1953.

He was the son of Watford Rovers footballer Charlie Peacock, who later became the owner of the Watford Observer, the town's newspaper.

Selected filmography
 The Manxman (1929)
 The Clue of the New Pin (1929)
 The Crooked Billet (1929)
 A Warm Corner (1930)
 The Mad Hatters (1935)
 Expert's Opinion (1935)
 Midnight at Madame Tussaud's (1936)
 Grand Finale (1936)
 Captain's Orders (1937)
 Alert in the Mediterranean (1938)
 Hell's Cargo (1939)
 Flannelfoot (1953)

References

External links
 

1901 births
1966 deaths
English male film actors
English male silent film actors
People from Watford
English male radio actors
Male actors from Hertfordshire
20th-century English male actors